At the junction of the floor and anterior wall of the third ventricle, immediately above the optic chiasma, the ventricle presents a small angular recess or diverticulum, the optic recess (or supraoptic recess).

Additional images

References 

Ventricular system